Sohrab H. Bhoot (or Sorabji Bhoot or Sorab Bhoot) (1891 – 9 January 1984) was an Indian Olympian administrator and sports administrator in the early and middle 20th century.

Biography 

Bhoot's major accomplishments were to serve as:
 Manager of India's first Olympic team at the 1920 Olympics in Antwerp. He was also a selector and administrator for the Indian team at four other Olympics. 
 President of the National Cycling Federation of India.  Bhoot and Jankidas co-founded this national cycling federation in 1946. Under Bhoot's management, the Indian cycling team made its Olympic debut at the 1948 Olympics in London.  Bhoot also served as President of the Asian Cycling Federation. Overall, he took the Indian cycling team to several international cycling events and world cycling championships from the late 1940s until the early 1960s.
 General Secretary of the Bombay Provincial Olympic Association—in this capacity he was also Organising Secretary for, and played a major role in organising and administering, the 1950 Indian national games  (the 14th such national games) at Bombay. Bhoot was also on several committees of the Bombay Olympic Association (such as the finance committee in 1939–1940) and was an organiser of the 1940 Indian national games in Bombay. Further, he was an official at other Indian national games and athletics championships--for example, he was one of the approximately 20 members of the Jury of Honour and Appeal at the Indian national games in 1948 (Lucknow) and 1944 (Patiala) and at several Indian athletics championships such as the 14th championships in 1949 (Delhi).
 A key organiser of the 1951 Asian games. 
 Secretary of the Technical Committee for the Athletics Federation of India. 
 Member of the managing committee, as well as treasurer, of the Indian Olympic Association. 
 Editor of the Sports Herald.

Bhoot died on 9 January 1984 at the age of 92.  His obituary was carried in the Jam-e-Jamshed, titled "The Grand Old Man of Sports". It noted that Bhoot was "one of the founders of the Olympic Movement in India, he helped put Indian sportsmen on the world field and was responsible for promoting many sports noticeably athletics and cycling." It mentioned his many accomplishments, for example that "He was with the late Melwyn D'Mello (Anthony de Mello), a star organiser of the first Asian Games at Delhi." And it highlighted his strong personal traits: 'being of strong character, he never tolerated faulty organisation,' and always 'stood for the just cause of sportsmen.'

See also 

 Cycling Federation of India
 1950 National Games of India
 Indian Olympic Association
 India at the 1920 Olympics

Pictures

1891 births
1984 deaths
Indian male cyclists
India at the Olympics